Islam is a minority religion in French Guiana. The Islamic population is made up of mainly Arabs from Lebanon, and Afghan Muslims. In Cayenne, the capital of the region, and Kourou, there is an Islamic centre and a Muslim school. Majority of the Muslims belong to Sunni denomination. There are a few Ahmadi Muslims who established themselves in the region in the year 2007.

References

Guiana
Religion in French Guiana
French Guiana
Id:Islam di Guyana Perancis